The Yamaha TW200 is a 196 cc single cylinder dual-sport motorcycle manufactured and marketed by Yamaha since 1987.  TW is short for Trail Way. In 2001 an update was made that removed the kick start and replaced the front drum brake with a disc brake. Due to its large tires, it has been compared to the 2-wheel-drive Rokon and has been called a "two-wheeled quad".

Shinji Kazama rode a TW200 to the North Pole in 1987.

In a review of the 2020 model, Ultimate Motorcycling said, "If you're patient and persistent, the TW can take you almost anywhere."

References

TW200
Dual-sport motorcycles
Motorcycles introduced in 1987